is a Japanese television drama series that aired on BS-TBS from April 5, 2008 to March 28, 2009.

Cast
 Rio Yamashita
 Erena Mizusawa
 Nanami Sakuraba
 Aya Ōmasa
 Anri Okamoto
 Misaki Uryū
 Mayū Kusakari
 Azusa Okamoto
 Marika Fukanaga
 Chiho Hinata
 Erina Mano
 Yu Sorua

References

External links
  

2008 in Japanese television
2009 in Japanese television
2008 Japanese television series debuts
2009 Japanese television series endings
Japanese drama television series
Television shows written by Eriko Shinozaki